Edwin Morris Jones (born 20 April 1914 in Abercynon, Wales) was a footballer who played in the English Football League for Bolton Wanderers and Swindon Town. He also played for Chippenham Town.

References

Welsh footballers
Bolton Wanderers F.C. players
Swindon Town F.C. players
English Football League players
1914 births
1984 deaths
Association football wingers